Min Hyun-sik (born 21 October 1946) is a South Korean architect.

Biography 
Min was born in 1946, in Gyeongnam, Korea. After having worked and studied under architect Kim Swoo Geun of Space Group and architect Yoon Seung Joong of Wondoshi Architects Group (of which he had been a partner since 1980), he studied at the Architectural Association School of Architecture in London, UK, in 1989/1990. In 1992, he started his own practice H. Min Architect and Associates. In 1997, he was one of the core members to establish a school of visual arts at the Korea National University of Arts, at which he holds a professorship to this day.

His active communication with the public first became recognized with "Housing with Deep Space", exhibited in the 1992 show "Echoes of an Era". Since then he has continually presented new projects, each one of them containing creative issues, for example, "Phenomenological Aesthetics", "Madang; Specific indeterminate space", "Architectural Landscape", "Structuring Emptiness; ethics over aesthetics".

Extending his architectural interests into urbanism, he participated in several urban planning and design projects, for example, "Paju Landscape Script" for Paju Book City, and the schematic design of "Gwangju, the Capital City of Asian Culture". His works and ideas have always been the center of debate and controversy, and have marked important turning points in Korean architecture and urbanism.

Most of all, his works have centered on "Structuring Emptiness", which stems from Korean traditional architecture.
Min's propositions in architecture are continually concerned with "Structuring Emptiness" which is a design of potentials: as infrastructures of daily lives deeply related to the properties and intimacies of the site it sit on. This idea aims to reach beyond the level of objectification in architecture.
Abstracting the geological features of the site, he creates a specific architectural landscape. Alternative to symbolic architecture, this idea presents a way to search for different dimensions of architecture and reach beyond the level of objectification. His works are not only searching for the identity of Korean contemporary architecture but also developing and expanding those ideas to generate a theory of the future.

Presented by works, publications, articles, teaching, and international exhibitions, including Venice Biennale 1996/2000/2002, "Structuring Emptiness" invited by University of Pennsylvania in 2003, and "Paju Book City" at Aedes West in Berlin, 2005, his creative ideas shows us the possibility of acquiring universality in the realm of architecture.

Profile
 2006 Honorary Fellowship FAIA (Hon. FAIA) Fellow of the American Institute of Architects
 2002 ~ 2004 Dean of Faculty of Visual Art in Korea National University of Arts,
 1997 ~ Prof. Department of Architecture in Korea National University of Arts,
 1997 ~ Adviser of KIOHUN
 1996 ~ 1997 Chairman of KIOHUN
 1992 ~ 1996 Chairman of Architectural Research(Former KIOHUN)
 1980 ~ 1992 Urban and Architecture Office 'ONE'
 1974 ~ 1975 Architectural Group ‘JANG’
 1972 ~ 1974 SPACE Group

Notable works 

 Sindohrico Company
 2004 ~ 2005 Qingdao Complex
 1999 Asan Factory
 1999 Head Office and Seoul Factory
 1994 Administration Building
 1991 Hostel for Sindohrico Workers
 Educational Facilities
 2001 ~ 2009 Daejeon University Comprehensive Campus Plan, Munmugwan, Multi-Activity Center, etc.
 1999 Moontae High School
 1998 Korean National University of Cultural Heritage  (homepage)
 1998 National Conservatory of Korea Traditional Music
 Office Building
 2005 Head Office & Exhibition Gallery of R-TOTO Company
 2004 Hayyim Building,a office complex for venture enterprises
 2000 Sanggye Branch Shop of Juno Hair
 Housing
 2008 WALDHAUS JISAN
 2000 Housing with Deep Space
 1999 Unit Plan and Design of Samsung Tower Palace
 1995 Bongchun residential district development Apartment
 Religious Building
 2005 Dongsoong Presbyterian Church
 1997 Sungyak Presbyterian Church
 Hospital
 2006 Gimcheon Silver Hospital
 1999 Pohang Christianity Hospital
 Paju Book City
 2005 Bupmoonsa Publication Company
 2004 KD Media Paju Book City
 2004 Language and Creation Publication  Company
 2004 BOOKXEN, Publication Distribution Complex
 2004 Paju Landscape Script of Paju Book City
 2004 Info-Room of Paju Book City
 ETC
 2009 Korea Institute of Science and Technology (Jeonbuk Branch)
 2007 Haenam Hwawon resort
 2005 Pyung Hoa Nuri Pieace Park + Youth Training center
 2005 UNESCO World Heritage Jongmyo
 1995 National Museum of Korea Competition

References

External links 
민현식, 인생과 시대, 기억의 책장을 펼치며 -  June 2011. weekly.hankooki.com
나의 건축을 말한다 3: 민현식의 서울 강남구 로얄&컴퍼니 사옥 -  November 2009. donga.com
SEOUL SCAPE, BERLAGE INSTITUTE, ROTTERDAM - May 2008. Arqchile.cl
's(e)oul scape: towards a new urbanity in korea' at the berlage institute - designboom.com
S(E)OUL SCAPE - www.image-web.org
Korea's Modern Architecture of the 20th century - winter 2008. Koreana Webzine
Space #478. ARCHITECT Min Hyun Sik. SPACE. ISSN 1228-2472
Urban Facilities. Pyeong Hoa Nuri. C3. 
Campus. Domitory for DaeJeon University, The Korean National University of Cultural Heritage, MACC Multi Activity Center for DaeJeon University. C3. 
Churches. DongSoong Church Extension, SungYak Presbyterian Church. C3. 
Identity Workspace. HAYYIM Building,Sindoricoh Headquarters, Sindoricoh Headquarters and SeoUL Factory. C3. 
The Canon of Architect: Essays on Architecture by 11 Architects. 열화당(youlhwadang). 2005. 

1946 births
Living people
South Korean architects
20th-century South Korean architects
21st-century architects
Seoul National University alumni
People from South Gyeongsang Province
Academic staff of Korea National University of Arts